The 319th Military Intelligence Battalion is a military intelligence battalion in the United States Army and is part of the 525th Military Intelligence Brigade (Expeditionary).

History
The 319th Military Intelligence Battalion (Operations) traces its lineage to the 319th Military Intelligence Headquarters Detachment at Bad Schwalbach, Germany, 1 August 1945, an interrogation unit for German Prisoners of War.

In 1946, the unit was sent to Japan. It was joined by other interrogation units which served in the Philippines in 1944 and later the reformed 319th served in the Korean War. After deactivation in 1968, the battalion was reactivated in 1982 at Fort Bragg, North Carolina, as a subordinate unit of the 525th Military Intelligence Brigade to provide both general intelligence support and special communications support to the XVIII Airborne Corps. In October 1983, elements of the battalion deployed to the island of Grenada for Operation Urgent Fury.

In 1988, battalion personnel participated in the emergency deployment to Honduras to counter an incursion by Nicaraguan forces. In 1989, the 319th deployed to Panama in support of Operation Just Cause. The 319th MI Battalion deployed to Saudi Arabia for Operation Desert Shield as part of the XVIII Airborne Corps. In September 1994, the battalion deployed to the island of Haiti in support of Operation Uphold Democracy.

In December 1995 and again in October 1996, the battalion deployed elements to Hungary, Italy, and Bosnia in support of Operation Joint Endeavor. In March 2003, the Battalion's B Company (TENCAP) deployed to Operation Iraqi Freedom in support of the 1st Marine Expeditionary Force (MEF).

In November 2004 the 319th (Task Force Hurricane) deployed to Baghdad, Iraq along with the 525th MI BDE (Task Force Lightning) ahead of the XVIII Airborne Corps assuming the mission of the Multi-National Corps Iraq (MNC-I), as well as intelligence responsibilities for the Multi-National Force Iraq (MNF-I). Alpha Company and Bravo Company incorporated personnel of 297th MI BN, 513th MI BDE (INSCOM) which became a separate BN Task Force under 525th MI BDE, doubling their deployed strength and equipment. The units redeployed in November 2005 after turning the mission over to V Corps' 302nd MI BN, 205th MI BDE. During this time, Bravo Company, 319th MI BN (Task Force Banshee) became the first unit to download RQ-4 Global Hawk imagery in a theater of war.

The 319th Military Intelligence Battalion later deployed to Regional Command South, Afghanistan in support of Operation Enduring Freedom in July 2010 and stayed there until July 2011. After returning to Fort Bragg, North Carolina the 319th Military Intelligence Battalion prepared for another deployment. They deployed to Regional Command East, Afghanistan in support of Operation Enduring Freedom in January 2013 and returned to Fort Bragg, North Carolina in October 2013.

Lineage
Constituted 14 July 1945 in the Army of the United States as the 319th Headquarters Intelligence Detachment
Activated 1 August 1945 in Germany
Inactivated 31 October 1946 in Germany
Redesignated 20 December 1946 as the 319th Military Intelligence Company
Activated 30 December 1946 in Japan
Reorganized and redesignated 1 September 1952 as the 319th Military Intelligence Service Company and allotted to the Regular Army
Inactivated 28 March 1954 in Japan
Redesignated 14 January 1955 as the 319th Military Intelligence Battalion
Activated 7 March 1955 at Fort George G. Meade, Maryland
Reorganized and redesignated 25 January 1958 as Headquarters and Headquarters Company, 319th Military Intelligence Battalion
(162d Military Intelligence Company [see ANNEX 1] reorganized and redesignated 13 July 1959 as Company A)
Battalion inactivated 15 February 1968 at Fort Shafter, Hawaii
Activated 1 April 1982 at Fort Bragg, North Carolina (336th Army Security Agency Company [see ANNEX 2] concurrently reorganized and redesignated as Company B)

Annex 1

Constituted 5 April 1945 in the Army of the United States as the 162d Language Detachment
Activated 23 April 1945 in the Philippine Islands
Inactivated 10 February 1946 in Japan
Redesignated 14 January 1955 as the 162d Military Intelligence Platoon and allotted to the Regular Army
Activated 7 March 1955 at Fort George G. Meade, Maryland
Reorganized and redesignated 25 January 1958 as the 162d Military Intelligence Company

Annex 2

Constituted 1 July 1952 in the Regular Army as the 336th Communication Reconnaissance Company
Activated 6 August 1952 at Fort Devens, Massachusetts
Reorganized and redesignated 16 May 1955 as Company A, 311th Communication Reconnaissance Battalion
Redesignated 1 July 1956 as Company A, 311th Army Security Agency Battalion
Inactivated 18 December 1957 at Camp Wolters, Texas
Disbanded 15 February 1966
Reconstituted 21 September 1978 in the Regular Army as the 336th Army Security Agency Company
Activated 16 September 1979 at Fort Bragg, North Carolina

Campaign participation credit
Southwest Asia: Defense of Saudi Arabia; Liberation and Defense of Kuwait

Company A additionally entitled to:

World War II: Luzon
Armed Forces Expeditions: Panama

Decorations
Meritorious Unit Commendation (Army) for KOREA 1953
Meritorious Unit Commendation (Army) for SOUTHWEST ASIA 1990–1991
Operation Iraqi Freedom
Meritorious Unit Commendation 2007
Meritorious Unit Commendation 2009
Operation Enduring Freedom
Meritorious Unit Commendation 2011

A Company
A Company additionally entitled to:
Philippine Presidential Unit Citation for 17 OCTOBER 1944 TO 4 JULY 1945

References

319